Ana Luz Juárez Alejo is a Mexican lawyer and politician affiliated with the National Action Party. As of 2014 she served as Deputy of the LIX Legislature of the Mexican Congress representing San Luis Potosí as replacement of Francisco Xavier Salazar Diez.

References

Date of birth unknown
Living people
People from San Luis Potosí
Women members of the Chamber of Deputies (Mexico)
Mexican women lawyers
National Action Party (Mexico) politicians
Year of birth missing (living people)
Deputies of the LIX Legislature of Mexico
Members of the Chamber of Deputies (Mexico) for San Luis Potosí
21st-century Mexican lawyers